"Love Sosa" is the second single by rapper Chief Keef from his debut studio album Finally Rich (2012). It was released on October 18, 2012. The song was produced by Young Chop, and written by both Wallace Willis and Chief Keef.

The accompanying music video was directed by Duan Gaines, more commonly known as DGainz. The film features Chief Keef and his collective performing in front of the camera while inside a house. The music video was released on October 18, 2012, the same day the single was released.

Release

The song leaked to the internet unfinished in 2012, and about a week later, it was leaked in full version. The song was released through iTunes a few weeks later.

Music video

The music video, directed by DGainz, was shot and released on October 18, 2012. It was shot in the same spot as the video for Keef's first single "I Don't Like". The video was shot on the South Side of Chicago. The video has over 200 million views on YouTube.

Remix
Although an official remix is not released yet, in December 2012 the song's producer Young Chop stated that Drake and French Montana may appear on another version of the song. On January 16, 2013, MMG artists Rick Ross and Stalley released a freestyle over the instrumental of "Love Sosa".

Reception
Complex ranked the song number 20 on their list of the 50 best songs of 2012. Rapper Drake praised the song on Twitter, saying he played it 130 times in three days. Chief Keef announced "Love Sosa" would be in Grand Theft Auto V, however this would turn out to be false.

Charts

Weekly charts

Year-end charts

Certifications

References

2012 singles
2012 songs
Chief Keef songs
American hip hop songs
Gangsta rap songs
Songs written by Young Chop
Songs written by Chief Keef